Mount Roberts or Roberts Peak is a  mountain just east of downtown Juneau, Alaska. It is noted for its accessibility from downtown Juneau and for the Goldbelt Tram which carries passengers and tourists from sea level to  up the mountain.

A trail head behind downtown leads to the top of the tram (with nearly 2 miles of steep switchbacks) and from that point to the summit where the views to the west overlook the harbor, West Juneau and Douglas Island.



See also

References

External links

 

Mountains of Alaska
Mountains of Juneau, Alaska